Baldur Ragnarsson (25 August 1930 – 25 December 2018) was an Icelandic poet and author of Esperanto works. He was a teacher and a superintendent of schools in Iceland.

Esperanto 
Baldur learned Esperanto at school in 1949 and was active in the movement to promote the use of this language since 1952. He was president of the Icelandic Esperanto Association for many years. He presided over the World Esperanto Association's literary contest from 1975 to 1985. He was president of the organizing committee for the 1977 World Esperanto Congress at Reykjavík and vice-president of the World Esperanto Association in charge of culture and education from 1980 to 1986. He was thereafter an honorary member of this organization.

A Member of the Esperanto Academy since 1979, he was editor of the journal Norda Prismo from 1958 to 1974.

In 2007 the Association of Esperanto-speaking authors (Esperantlingva Verkista Asocio) nominated him as their candidate for the Nobel Prize in Literature following the death of William Auld in 2006.

Works
Baldur composed poetic works in Icelandic as well as books on the Icelandic language. He was also written two collections of Esperanto poems: Ŝtupoj sen nomo and Esploroj.

In 2007 Edistudio published La lingvo serena, his complete works. In addition to the poems of his two previous collections, the book contains all the poems he was published subsequently, as well as all the essays he has written on literature and linguistics. All subsequent poetry books (2008 to 2016) were published by Mondial in New York.

Poetry
 Ŝtupoj sen Nomo, 1959
 Esploroj, 1974
 "Deflorazione" and "Malvirgigo" in El la nova ĝardeno (Dal nuovo giardino), Dante Bertolini, ed., Pedrazzini: Locarno, 1979, 100 pp.
 La lingvo serena, 2007
 La neceso akceptebla, 2008
 La fontoj nevideblaj, 2010
 Laŭ neplanitaj padoj, 2013
 Momentoj kaj meditoj, 2016

Translations into Esperanto
 Sub stelo rigida, two collections by the Icelandic poet Þorsteinn frá Hamri, 1963
 Islandaj pravoĉoj, three tales and a poem from Old Icelandic literature, 1964
 Sagao de Njal, Njáls saga, the greatest of the Icelandic sagas, 2003
 Sendependaj homoj, Halldór Laxness's Independent People, a novel about rural Iceland at the turn of the 20th century, 2007
 La Edda de Snorri Sturluson, Snorri Sturluson's Prose Edda, 2008
 Vundebla loko (Translation of poems by the award-winning Icelandic author Gerður Kristný), 2009
 Sagao de la Volsungoj - kaj ĝiaj fontoj ("Saga of the Völsungs - and its sources", translation of the most famous of the legendary sagas, the theme of which is the Old Norse-Germanic mythological heroes) 2011
 Sagao de Egil (Translation of Egil's Saga, one of the 40 so-called Sagas of Icelanders) 2011
In addition, he has published dozens of translations in various journals, in recent times principally in the journal La tradukisto .

Essays
 La Sagaoj kaj Zamenhof: stabiligaj faktoroj 1982
 Studado de alia lingvo 1982
 "Esperanto kiel anti-lingvo" in Serta gratulatoria in honorem Juan Régulo. Universidad de La Laguna, Salamanca, 3,266 pp., 1986 
 La proza poemo: la ĝenro, ĝiaj latentoj kaj aplikoj 1987
 La Poezia Arto (Five lectures) 1988
 Cent jaroj de poezio en Esperanto". 1989
 La poezio de la skaldoj La poemoj de Armand Su 1993
 Kombino de poeta virtuozeco kaj ties instrumento 1994
 Tradukante la antikvan islandan literaturon en Esperanto 1998
 "La fono kaj la fronto: kelkaj konsideroj pri semiotikaj aspektoj de la Esperanta poezio" in Lingva arto. Vilmos Benczik, ed., Universala Esperanto-Asocio, Rotterdam: 1999, 217 pp. 
 La lingvo serena 2007
 Tungumál Veraldar'' 2009

See also

 List of Icelandic writers
 Icelandic literature

References

External links
 Prezento pri Baldur Ragnarsson in la ttt-ejo de la Islanda Verkista Asocio
 Baldur Ragnarsson in  Originala literaturo Esperanta
 Baldur Ragnarsson in Literaturo, en la reto, en Esperanto
 Original Poetry and translations by Baldur Ragnarsson from 2008 to 2016 at the publishing house Mondial in New York

Translators to Esperanto
Writers of Esperanto literature
Akademio de Esperanto members
Baldur Ragnarsson
Baldur Ragnarsson
1930 births
2018 deaths
20th-century Icelandic poets
21st-century Icelandic poets
20th-century translators